The IIHF World Ranking is a ranking of the performance of the national ice hockey teams of member countries of the International Ice Hockey Federation (IIHF). It is based on a formula giving points for each team's placings at IIHF-sanctioned tournaments over the previous four years. The ranking is used to determine seedings and qualification requirements for future IIHF tournaments. The current leader in rankings is Finland in men's play and Canada in women's play.

Description
The system was approved at the IIHF congress of September 2003. According to former IIHF President René Fasel, the system was designed to be simple to understand and "reflect the long-term quality of all national hockey programs and their commitment to international hockey".

The ranking is used to determine the seeding of the teams for the next World Championship and to select the teams which can participate in Winter Olympics without playing in the qualifying round. For example, for the 2022 Winter Olympics, the first eight teams of the Men's World Ranking and the first six of the Women's World Ranking were pre-qualified. Qualification for the men's tournament at the 2022 Winter Olympics was structured around the 2019 ranking. Twelve spots were made available for teams. The top eight teams in the World Ranking after the 2019 Men's World Ice Hockey Championships received automatic berths into the Ice Hockey event. All IIHF teams had an opportunity to qualify for the event. Teams that wished to participate ranked below 36th played in two preliminary qualifications in November 2019. The two winners of the first preliminaries and teams ranked 27–36th were divided in three groups to play in the second pre-qualification round in December 2019. The three winners of those preliminaries joined teams ranked 18–26th for the third pre-qualification round of three groups in February 2020. The winner of each of these pre-qualification groups and teams ranked 9–17 were divided in three groups to play in the final qualification in August 2021. The winner of each group then joined the eight top-ranked teams plus the host in the Olympics in 2022.

The women's tournament uses a similar qualification format. The top six teams in the IIHF Women's World Ranking after the 2020 IIHF Women's World Championship received automatic berths into the ice hockey event. Lower ranked teams had an opportunity to qualify for the event. Teams ranked 16th and below were divided into three groups where they played in a preliminary qualification round in the October 2021. The three group winners from the round advanced to the final qualification round, where the teams ranked seventh through fifteenth joined them.

Formula
The world ranking is based on the final positions of the last four Men's or Women's IIHF World Championships and last Olympic ice hockey tournament. Points are assigned according to a team's final placement in the World Championship or the Olympic tournament. The world champion receives 1200 points and then a 20-point interval is used between teams. However, a 40-point interval is used between gold and silver, silver and bronze, fourth and fifth, and eighth and ninth. This is used as a bonus for the teams who reach the quarter-finals, the semi-finals, the final and for winning the gold medal.

Points awarded in the current year are valued at the full amount. Points award in the prior years decline linearly by 25% until the fifth year when they are dropped from the calculation. Under this formula, any year with a World Championship and an Olympics will be counted twice in the tables, for a maximum ranking (gold medal in all five events) of: 4200 points at the completion of an Olympic year, 3900 points at the completion of the following year, 3600 points the next year, and 3300 points in the year before the next Olympics. For example, if after the 2020 Championship a team had won the gold medal in the last four championships and the last Olympic tournament, their score would be 3600:

Men's rankings

The Men's 2023 ranking is based on the performance at the World Championships of 2023, 2022, 2021, and 2020, and at the Olympic Ice Hockey tournament of 2022.

All tournaments in 2020 were cancelled due to the COVID-19 pandemic. As a result, teams were awarded points based on their seeding for their respective tournaments. The Championship division received points based on the 2019 World Ranking, while the remaining divisions received points based on the previous year's results. For a fairer ranking and point distribution, the IIHF Council decided that the points for 2021 in case of tournament cancellations are given according to the ranking position of each team in the 2021 Pre-Championship Report – taking into consideration the results in 2018, 2019 and 2020 – rather than by seeding as in the past.

For the 2022 Winter Olympics, Russia was still under a 2019 ban by the World Anti-Doping Agency (WADA) because of that country's state-sponsored doping scheme. On 19 February 2021, the International Olympic Committee announced that individual athletes from Russia, who had consistently passed ongoing anti-doping tests, could compete under the acronym "ROC" (the full name "Russian Olympic Committee" could not be displayed), and that the flag of the Russian Olympic Committee would be used for the COVID-19 pandemic-delayed 2020 Summer Olympics and the unchanged 2022 Winter Olympics.

Russia and Belarus were expelled from competing in the 2022 and 2023 World Championships because of their invasion of Ukraine. They were, however, granted the points of the positions they would have been seeded based on their 2021 ranking: in 2022, Russia in third place received 1120 points, and Belarus in 14th place received 860 points. Several nations withdrew from the 2022 World Championships over COVID-19 concerns. These nations similarly received the points of the positions they would have been seeded within their respective tournaments: Australia as second place in IIA received 560 points, New Zealand as third place in IIB received 440 points, North Korea as first place in IIIA received 360 points, Hong Kong as second place in IIIB received 220 points, and the Philippines as fourth place in IV received 100 points. 

The following table lists the full breakdown of ranking following the 2022 Men's Ice Hockey World Championships, and the calculations of the rankings following the 2023 Men's Ice Hockey World Championships. Scores in italics represent minimum possible scores for unfinished tournaments. All tournament's points have their full value displayed, while the ranking is calculated by adding the current year's tournament points to the depreciated previous three years' tournament points as explained above. The depreciated percentages are shown in the column headings, first for the current total, then for the new total. The "Total" columns are the sums of the current tournament points and the depreciated values for past tournaments. The "+/–" columns indicate the increase or decrease in ranking since the last tournament. A dash in a tournament column indicates that the country did not participate.

Women's rankings

The Women's 2023 ranking is based on the performance at the World Championships of 2023, 2022, 2021, and 2020, and at the Olympic Ice Hockey tournament of 2022. 

Most of the tournaments in 2020 were cancelled due to the COVID-19 pandemic. As a result, teams were awarded points based on their seeding for their respective tournaments. The Championship division received points based on the 2019 World Ranking, while Divisions IA, IB, and IIA received points based on the previous year's results. Divisions IIB and III were completed and scored as scheduled. 

For the 2022 Winter Olympics, Russia was still under a 2019 ban by the World Anti-Doping Agency (WADA) because of that country's state-sponsored doping scheme. On 19 February 2021, the International Olympic Committee announced that individual athletes from Russia, who had consistently passed ongoing anti-doping tests, could compete under the acronym "ROC" (the full name "Russian Olympic Committee" could not be displayed), and that the flag of the Russian Olympic Committee would be used for the COVID-19 pandemic-delayed 2020 Summer Olympics and the unchanged 2022 Winter Olympics.

The following table lists the ranking following the 2022 Women's Ice Hockey World Championships, and the calculations of the rankings following the  2023 Women's Ice Hockey World Championships. Scores in italics represent minimum possible scores for unfinished tournaments. All tournament's points have their full value displayed, while the ranking is calculated by adding the current year's tournament points to the depreciated previous three years' tournament points as explained above. The depreciated percentages are shown in the column headings, first for the current total, then for the new total. The "Total" columns are the sums of the current tournament points and the depreciated values for past tournaments. The "+/–" columns indicate the increase or decrease in ranking since the last tournament. A dash in a tournament column indicates that the country did not participate.

See also
List of IIHF World Rankings

References

External links
World Ranking for the current year at IIHF.com
World Rankings from 2007 to 2018 at IIHF.com

Sports world rankings
International Ice Hockey Federation
Ice hockey statistics
2003 introductions